The 22nd Golden Horse Awards (Mandarin:第22屆金馬獎) took place on November 2, 1985, at Kaohsiung Cultural Center in Kaohsiung, Taiwan.

References

22nd
1985 film awards
1985 in Taiwan